Vilmos Wilheim (25 November 1895 – 1962) was a Hungarian football manager and former player.

Club career
Born in Hungarian capital Budapest, he played with KAOE before joining Ferencváros in 1916 and playing with them in the Hungarian championship since 1917. Later, he played in Italy with Vicenza (1923–24) and Cremonese (seasons 1925–26 and 1026–27). He made 15 appearances and scored 2 goals in the 1926–27 Divisione Nazionale

Coaching career
After retiring, he started his coaching career. Between 1928 and 1939 he coached in Italy the following clubs: Vicenza, Spezia, Foggia and Padova. Then he moved to Yugoslavia, coaching Bosnian side FK Slavija in their campaign in the 1939–40 Yugoslav Football Championship. In the late 1940s he returned to Italy and coached for second time Padova and Vicenza.

He was known in Italy also as Wilmas Wilhelm or Guglielmo Wilhelm.

References

1895 births
1962 deaths
Footballers from Budapest
Hungarian footballers
Association football defenders
Ferencvárosi TC footballers
Nemzeti Bajnokság I players
L.R. Vicenza players
U.S. Cremonese players
Serie A players
Expatriate footballers in Italy
Hungarian football managers
L.R. Vicenza managers
Spezia Calcio managers
Calcio Foggia 1920 managers
Calcio Padova managers
Expatriate football managers in Italy
Hungarian expatriate sportspeople in Italy
FK Slavija Sarajevo managers
Expatriate football managers in Yugoslavia
Hungarian expatriate sportspeople in Yugoslavia